Lucas Green is a village in Lancashire, England.

References

Villages in Lancashire
Geography of Chorley